Indhu is a 1994 Indian Tamil-language dance film directed by Pavithran and produced by N. A. Sudhakar and K. P. Unnikrishnan. The film featured Prabhu Deva, appearing in his first leading role as the newcomer, alongside Roja, while Sarathkumar and Khushbu play supporting roles. It was released on 14 April 1994.

Plot

Cast 

 Prabhu Deva as Chinnasamy / (Pattasu)
 Roja as Indhu
 Sukran as Antony Felix Peter
 Jawahar as Pazhani
 Rajkumar as Sottai
 Ponnambalam as Veeraiyan
 Sandhya Rani as Jameela
 Kumarimuthu as Tea master
 Oru Viral Krishna Rao as Millworker
 Mannangatti Subramaniam as Kanakku
 Ennathe Kannaiah as Servant
 Kalidoss as Police inspector
 Krishnamoorthy as Police inspector
 Sarathkumar as Kaasi (guest appearance)
 Khushbu in a special appearance

Production 
The film marked Prabhu Deva's debut as an actor in the leading role, after he appeared as a dancer in several earlier films.

Soundtrack 
The soundtrack of the film composed by Deva, was well received by the audience. During the audio release of Mattuthavani (2012), Deva paid tribute to the director Pavithran for giving him the opportunity to score the music for his earlier films like Indhu. The lyrics were written by Vaali. The song Aeye Gnanam was inspired by  R. D. Burman's Hindi song Jaana O Meri Jaana, sung by Kishore Kumar from the 1982 film Sanam Teri Kasam. For the dubbed Telugu version, all lyrics were written by Rajasri.

Release and reception 
Indhu was released on 14 April 1994. The Indian Express wrote "The film is hence dance oriented with the storyline given a go by". R. P. R. of Kalki praised Prabhu Deva's dance and Sarathkumar's acting but panned Ashok Kumar's cinematography as out of focus and also panned the vulgar dialogues and lyrics. The film's release in Malaysia was marred by heavy censorship, with several fight scenes omitted.

It was reported that Pavithran was considering making a film titled Mookkuthi Kaasi featuring Sarathkumar's character from Indhu, and the project started in 1996. However Sarathkumar was ousted from the project soon after and replaced by Bhaskar Raj, who had appeared in Nethaji. The film, which also featured Kushboo and Roja, was later shelved.

References

External links 
 

1990s dance films
1990s Tamil-language films
1994 films
Films scored by Deva (composer)
Indian dance films